Sphecodes ferruginatus  is a Palearctic species of sweat bee.

References

External links
Images representing Sphecodes ferruginatus 

Hymenoptera of Europe
Halictidae
Insects described in 1882